The men's shot put was a track and field athletics event held as part of the athletics at the 1912 Summer Olympics programme. The competition was held on Wednesday, July 10, 1912. Twenty-two shot putters from 14 nations competed. NOCs could enter up to 12 athletes. The event was won by Pat McDonald of the United States, the nation's fifth consecutive victory in the men's shot put. The American team swept the top three places, the third time in five Games (1900, 1904). Ralph Rose took silver, 9 centimetres shy of a third gold medal; he became the first man to win three medals of any color (through the 2016 Games, matched only by Parry O'Brien).

Background

This was the fifth appearance of the event, which is one of 12 athletics events to have been held at every Summer Olympics. Two-time Olympic champion Ralph Rose returned after competing in 1904 and 1908; other 1908 competitors that returned in 1912 were Michalis Dorizas of Greece, Charles Lagarde and André Tison of France, and Elmer Niklander of Finland. Rose had been dominant from 1904 through 1910, but countryman Pat McDonald had beaten him in the AAU championships in 1911 and 1912. The Olympic competition was expected to be a match between the two, with everyone else vying for third.

Austria, Bohemia, Italy, Luxembourg, Russia, and Turkey made their debut in the men's shot put. Greece and the United States each appeared for the fifth time, having competed in all Olympic shot put competitions to date.

Competition format

The competition continued to use the two-round format used in 1900 and 1908, with results carrying over between rounds. Each athlete received three throws in the qualifying round. The top three men advanced to the final, where they received an additional three throws. The best result, qualifying or final, counted.

Records

These were the standing world and Olympic records (in metres) prior to the 1912 Summer Olympics.

Schedule

Results

Ralph Rose, the two-time defending Olympic champion and holder of the Olympic record (14.81 metres, set at the 1904 Summer Olympics), was unseated by Pat McDonald after a colossal throw in the final. Rose bettered his own record with his first throw, coming just shy of 15 metres. With his third throw, Rose again topped himself, heaving the shot 15.25 metres while none of the other competitors had yet matched his first throw. At the end of the preliminaries, Rose's 15.25 stood well above McDonald's 14.78 metres and Lawrence Whitney's 13.93 metres.

Each of the three finalists received three more throws for the finals, but only two out of the combined 9 throws were legal marks. Whitney, who had scratched twice in the preliminaries, did so three more times to make his 13.93 metres the only legal throw of his 6. Rose's first throw in the finals was measured at 14.96 metres, giving him three throws that were better than the old record. McDonald, however, launched his first throw fully 15.34 metres to take the record and the gold medal after none of the three throwers could make a legal mark in their second or third throws.

References

Sources
 
 

Athletics at the 1912 Summer Olympics
Shot put at the Olympics